Council of the Islamic Revolution formed Interim Government on Ruhollah Khomeini's order after resignation of Mehdi Bazargan because of Iran hostage crisis.

According to Ali Akbar Moinfar, Council of the Islamic Revolution chaired by Mohammad Beheshti as First Secretary until Abolhassan Banisadr elected as President of Iran. Banisadr was made head of the Revolutionary Council on 7 February 1980.

Cabinet 

|-
!colspan=6| * 
|-

See also 
 Interim Government of Iran
 Council of the Islamic Revolution

References 

1979 establishments in Iran
1980 disestablishments in Iran
Cabinets established in 1979
Cabinets disestablished in 1980
Cabinets of Iran
Revolutionary institutions of the Islamic Republic of Iran